Rudolf Tschudi (born 2 May, 1884 in Glarus, died 11 October 1960 in Basel) was a Swiss philologist, historian, and Orientalist.

Life 
Tschudi studied classical philology (Greek and Latin) as well as eastern philology in Basel, Erlangen (where he studied under Georg Jacob), and Tübingen and was a member of the Schwizerhüsli Basel, Erlanger, and Tübingen Wingolf fraternities. He then became an assistant professor in 1910 and a professor at the Hamburgisches Kolonialinstitut in 1914.

In 1919 he came to Zurich as an associate professor, and finally in 1922 to Ordinarius in Basel. Fritz Meier was among his students. Tschudi was co-editor of the book series "Turkish Library" (Türkische Bibliothek, published by Mayer & Müller in Berlin) and the magazine "Der Islam." His specialty was the Ottoman Empire and Turkish literature.

Bibliography 
 
 W. Behn, Concise biographical companion to Index Islamicus 3, 2004, 539.
 Rudolf Tschudi in the Basel University Library

1884 births
1960 deaths
Swiss classical scholars
Swiss orientalists
Scholars of Ottoman history